Bumblefoot may refer to:

Bumblefoot (infection), an infection found on the feet of birds of prey and some animals
Ron "Bumblefoot" Thal (born 1969), musician